Miyan Velayat may refer to:
Miyan Velayat District
Miyan Velayat Rural District